Nagoor Babu, known by his stage name Mano, is an Indian playback singer, voice-over artist, actor, producer, television anchor and composer.

Mano has recorded more than 24,000 songs for film and private  various Telugu, Tamil, Kannada, Malayalam, Hindi, Tulu, Konkani and Assamese films. He has also performed for over 3000 live concerts across the continents. He has recorded many songs for music director Ilayaraja. Mano is also recognized for being as the full-fledged dubbing artist for Rajinikanth in Telugu from Muthu (1995) onwards.

Career

Early days and debut

 
Taking the criticism in his stride, Mano went on recording as many as 500 songs with Ilaiyaraaja and slowly branched out to sing for other Tamil composers as well.

Voice-over dubbing
The year 1995 also saw another face of Mano as the voice-over dubbing artist in the Telugu film industry. He dubbed his voice for almost all Rajinikanth starrers in Telugu. His voice became almost synonymous with Rajinikanth and was in great demand by all the directors and producers. He also dubbed his voice for Kamal Haasan in some movies in Telugu.

Television works
Mano is hosting Manathodu Mano – a musical talk show in Jaya TV.

Personal life
Mano is married to Jameela in 1985. His son Shakir is an actor and has starred in Naanga (2012).

Filmography

As actor
Telugu
 1979: Needa
 1979: Rangoon Rowdy as Raju
 1980: Ketugadu
 1982: O Adadi O Magadu
1992: Hello Darling
 2003: Nee Manasu Naaku Telusu as himself
 2015: Shivam as Tanu's father
2021: Crazy Uncles as Reddy

Tamil
 1992: Singaravelan as Mano
1993: Porantha Veeda Puguntha Veeda as singer in song "Veettukku Vilakku"
 2003: Enakku 20 Unakku 18 as himself
 2014: Vetri Selvan as Ananthakrishnan
2023: Single Shankarum Smartphone Simranum

Television
 2019-2023: Jabardasth
 2019-2022: Extra Jabardasth
2022-2023: Kalyanam Kamaneeyam

As dubbing artist

Discography

Awards

 Mano received the "Kalaimaamani" Award from the Government of Tamil Nadu also State Award of Tamil Nadu for the song "Thuliyela" from Chinna Thambi.
 1991 – Tamil Nadu State Film Award for Best Male Playback – For Various films.
 1997 – Filmfare Award for Best Male Playback Singer - Telugu – Ruku Ruku Rukmini – Pelli
 He got Dr.Ghantasala award from Chief Minister of Andhra Pradesh

References

External links
 
 Mano interview at Idlebrain

Living people
1965 births
Indian male playback singers
Tamil playback singers
Kannada playback singers
Telugu playback singers
Bollywood playback singers
Singers from Andhra Pradesh
Male actors from Andhra Pradesh
People from Guntur district
20th-century Indian singers
Male actors in Tamil cinema
Indian male voice actors
Indian male film actors
Film producers from Andhra Pradesh
20th-century Indian male actors
Male actors in Telugu cinema
21st-century Indian male actors
20th-century Indian male singers